Nadezhda Nikolaevna Sokolova is a Russian freestyle wrestler. She won one of the bronze medals in the women's 50 kg event at the 2021 World Wrestling Championships in Oslo, Norway.

In 2022, she competed at the Yasar Dogu Tournament held in Istanbul, Turkey.

References

External links 
 

Living people
Russian female sport wrestlers
World Wrestling Championships medalists
1996 births
20th-century Russian women
21st-century Russian women